Rupert Charles Barneby (6 October 1911 – 5 December 2000) was a British-born self-taught botanist whose primary specialty was the Fabaceae (Leguminosae), the pea family, but he also worked on Menispermaceae and numerous other groups.  He was employed by the New York Botanical Garden from the 1950s until shortly before his death.

Barneby published prolifically and named and described over 1,100 new species.   In addition, he had 25 species named after him as well as four genera: Barnebya, Barnebyella, Barnebydendron, and Rupertia.  He received numerous prestigious botanical awards, including The New York Botanical Garden's Henry Allan Gleason Award (1980), the American Society of Plant Taxonomists' Asa Gray Award (1989), the International Association for Plant Taxonomy's Engler Silver Medal (1992), and the International Botanical Congress's Millennium Botany Award (1999).

His lifelong partner was Harry Dwight Dillon Ripley (1908–1973), with whom he collected botanical specimens across the western United States – particularly from the Fabaceae.

Publications

See also
 :Category:Taxa named by Rupert Charles Barneby

References

Secondary sources

External links 

 Barneby Legume Catalogue: Digital Monographs and Specimens.  Providing access to the life and research of Rupert C. Barneby.
 Dr. Rupert Charles Barneby

Welsh botanists
1911 births
2000 deaths
Botanists active in North America
Botanists with author abbreviations
20th-century American botanists
British emigrants to the United States